Grevillea 'Peaches and Cream' is new and much sought-after grevillea cultivar which has been recently  released in Australia.

The foliage takes on a bronze sheen in winter.

The cultivar is a cross between a white-flowered form of the Queensland species Grevillea banksii, and G. bipinnatifida from Western Australia, and was selected from a plant which arose in a garden in Logan Village, a southern suburb of Brisbane, in 1997. It was watched and propagated by Queensland horticulturists and SGAP members Dennis Cox and Janice Glazebrook, finally being patented in 2006.

It is of the same parentage as 'Superb'  and 'Robyn Gordon' and has similar prolific and sustained flowering. Grevillea 'Superb' has a deeper orange coloration in the flowers, while G. 'Robyn Gordon' is red.

Its small size lends itself to use in a small garden, and it is bird attracting.

Although not yet recorded, the cultivar is very similar to several cultivars which have been known to cause allergic contact dermatitis for certain individuals who come into contact with it, so caution is advised.

See also
 List of Grevillea cultivars

References

External links
Australian Cultivar Registration Authority: Grevillea 'Robyn Gordon'

Peaches and Cream
Cultivars of Australian plants
Proteales of Australia
Garden plants of Australia